Nika Futterman (born October 25, 1969) is an American voice and television actress. She is known for her voices in various animated series, including Asajj Ventress in Star Wars: The Clone Wars and Adam Lyon in My Gym Partner's a Monkey. She has voiced many characters for Nickelodeon, including Chum Chum in Fanboy & Chum Chum, Omnia in the Nickelodeon version of Winx Club, and Luna Loud in The Loud House.

Personal life
Futterman was born in New York City.

Career
Among her first professional acting roles were single episode appearances on Chicago Hope and Murphy Brown.

Voice acting
Futterman has provided her voice in many cartoons, including recurring roles on animated adventure and superhero series such as G.I. Joe: Renegades, Batman: The Brave and the Bold, and The Avengers: Earth's Mightiest Heroes.

Futterman is the voice of Asajj Ventress in the 2008 animated film The Clone Wars and its subsequent TV series as well as several related video games. She has provided the voice for Sy Snootles among other characters. She attended her first Star Wars Weekend on the last weekend of June 2012. She was on the show Behind the Force along with her cast members Ashley Eckstein and James Arnold Taylor with Supervising Director Dave Filoni. Futterman also voices Sticks the Jungle Badger in the Sonic Boom TV series and its associated video games, Sonic Boom: Shattered Crystal and Sonic Boom: Rise of Lyric.

Futterman also voiced Shaeeah Lawquane in Star Wars: The Bad Batch.

Singing career
Futterman performed the vocals "Give it to me, baby" in The Offspring hit single "Pretty Fly (For a White Guy)" and cameo backup vocals for a performance of Wham!'s "Careless Whisper" on an episode of Kids Incorporated. Some of Futterman's animated characters sing songs within the soundtrack of a show, as well. She sings the theme song of My Gym Partner's A Monkey in-character as Adam Lyon, Sandy of Bubble Guppies sang a song about coconut water several times in the episode she was featured in, Kip Ling of Histeria! usually only shows up in the songs on the show, the second title character of Fanboy & Chum Chum sings many times (Futterman is also often accompanied on lead vocals during the FB&CC songs by David Hornsby, who voices Fanboy), Stretch and Squeeze of Handy Manny sing two songs called "We Work Together" and "Hop Up, Jump In" alongside the other tools, and Luna Loud of The Loud House is a musician, and frequently sings. Futterman also performed the vocals as Catwoman for the song, "Birds of Prey" in the Batman: The Brave and the Bold episode, "The Mask of Matches Malone," along with Grey DeLisle and Tara Strong, who voiced Black Canary and Huntress respectively.

Filmography

Animated television
Adventure Time – Gridface Princess, Additional voices
American Dad! – Additional voices
Archer – Sia
Avatar: The Last Airbender – Smellerbee
Avengers Assemble – Gamora
The Avengers: Earth's Mightiest Heroes – Sif, Hela
Back at the Barnyard – Stamps
Batman: The Brave and the Bold – Catwoman, Lashina
Blaze and the Monster Machines - Paulina, Crab 3
Bubble Guppies – Sandy
Bob and Margaret – Additional voices
The Casagrandes – Alexis Flores (Season 1), Luna Loud
CatDog – Lola Caricola
ChalkZone – Veronica Sanchez
Chowder – Additional voices
Clarence – Sammy, additional voices
The Cleveland Show – Additional voices
Costume Quest - Kimberly Butterwear
Danger Rangers – Cancun Reporter, Raccoon Kid #1
DC Super Hero Girls – Hawkgirl
Dexter's Laboratory – Additional voices
Doc McStuffins – Rosie the Rescuer
El Tigre: The Adventures of Manny Rivera – Additional voices
The Family Chronicles Time – Runa
Fanboy & Chum Chum – Chum Chum, additional voices
Futurama – Additional voices
Guardians of the Galaxy – Angela
Generator Rex – Additional voices
G.I. Joe: Renegades – Lady Jaye, Female Reporter, Sheriff's Clerk
The Grim Adventures of Billy & Mandy – Dora
Hanazuki: Full of Treasures – Flochis
Handy Manny – Stretch, Squeeze & Gabriela (Season 1)
Hardboiled Eggheads – Pilar Escobar
Harvey Birdman, Attorney at Law – Debbie, Newscaster 1
Hey Arnold! – Olga Pataki
Histeria! – Kip Ling, additional voices
Hulk and the Agents of S.M.A.S.H. – Gamora, Lilandra Neramani
If You Give a Mouse a Cookie - Bright Shirt Girl
It's Pony - Candle Lady, Woman, Old Woman
Jake and the Never Land Pirates – Additional voices
Jakers! The Adventures of Piggley Winks – Seamus, Sean
Johnny Bravo – Additional voices
Kick Buttowski: Suburban Daredevil – Additional voices
Kim Possible – Zita Flores
Kung Fu Panda: Legends of Awesomeness – Additional voices
The Land Before Time – Ruby's Mother, Ali
The Legend of Korra – Ahnah
The Lion Guard – Zira
Lost in Oz – West, Triplet #1, Triplet #2, Triplet #3
The Loud House – Luna Loud, Boris, Mrs. Salter, Additional voices
Maya & Miguel – Miguel Santos
The Mighty B! – Additional voices
Mike, Lu & Og – Mike Mazinsky
Miles from Tomorrowland – Additional voices
Mickey Mouse Clubhouse – Singing Lock
Mickey Mouse Funhouse - Cuckoo-Loca
Mickey and the Roadster Racers – Cuckoo-Loca, Mrs. Thunderboom, Cuckoo La-La, Additional voices
Minnie's Bow-Toons – Cuckoo-Loca
My Gym Partner's a Monkey – Adam Lyon, Ms. Chameleon, Margaret Rhino, Donna Dorsal, various voices
The New Woody Woodpecker Show – Splinter
NFL Rush Zone – Ash Reynolds (Seasons 2–3)
Paranormal Action Squad – PAD
The Penguins of Madagascar – Automated Female Voice, Female Ad Executive, additional voices
Pig Goat Banana Cricket – Junior Ranger, Fan on Bus
Pound Puppies – Additional voices (uncredited)
The Powerpuff Girls – Additional voices
The Problem Solverz – Stratch
Random! Cartoons – Lulu, Cathy
Randy Cunningham: 9th Grade Ninja – Additional voices
Regular Show – Additional voices
Rugrats – Additional voices
Rugrats Pre-School Daze – Matthew
Rolling with the Ronks! - Mila (pilot)
Sanjay and Craig – Belle Pepper, additional voices
Scooby-Doo! Mystery Incorporated – Additional voices
The 7D – Additional voices
Shimmer and Shine - Dalia
The Simpsons – Additional voices
Sofia the First – Fortune Teller
Sonic Boom – Sticks
Squirrel Boy – Wanda Finkster
Star vs. the Forces of Evil – Additional voices
Star Wars: The Clone Wars – Asajj Ventress, Sy Snootles, TC-70, Shaeeah, Dono, Gardulla the Hutt
Star Wars: The Bad Batch – Fauja, Shaeeah
Star Wars Rebels – Presence
Stroker and Hoop – Keith, Danny, Goldie Hawn, Secretary, Kid 2
Teacher's Pet – Margarita Ratoncita
Teen Titans Go! – Sonia Conchita Hernández
Tenkai Knights – Beni / Venetta (English version)
The Tom and Jerry Show – Polly
The Super Hero Squad Show – Captain Brazil
Turbo FAST – Additional voices
Ultimate Spider-Man – Gamora, Kid
Vampirina – Buttons
The Wacky Adventures of Ronald McDonald: Scared Silly – Fry Kid #3
Winx Club (Nickelodeon version) – Omnia
Woody Woodpecker - Knothead
Xyber 9: New Dawn – Anakonda
Young Justice - Female Forager
The Zula Patrol – Wigg

Animated films

Theatrical animated films
Alpha and Omega – Porcupines
The Ant Bully – Ant #1, Ant #7
Barnyard – Additional voices
The Boxtrolls – Oil Can, Knickers
Casper's Scare School – Monaco
Delgo – Elder Jaspin
Fall Down a School – Ana Julia, Yasmin
Geppetto's Secret – Magic Wood, Pinocchio
The Loud House: Slice of Life – Luna Loud
The Marvel Experience – Madame Hydra/Viper
Open Season – Rosie
Open Season 2 – Rosie
Open Season 3 – Rosie
Rango – Akiano
Star Wars: The Clone Wars – TC-70, Asajj Ventress
The Wild – Dung Beetle #1

Live-action television

A Stranger Among Us - Narrator (voice)
Calls - 911 LA
Chicago Hope – Nikki Hodge
Diagnosis: Murder –  Ragna Clark
The Huntress – Olivia
Murphy Brown – Laura
Shasta McNasty – Photographer
Shushybye – Dreamsters PJ, Starbright, Snore (voices)
The Wayans Bros. – Assistant

Video games

Army Men: Air Attack 2 – Bombshell
Army Men: Sarge's Heroes 2 – Bridgette Bleu
Blue Dragon – Marumaro, Kelaso Village Old Woman
Blur – Narrator
Brütal Legend – Mombat, Daughterbat
Castle of Illusion – Mizrabel
Crimson Skies: High Road to Revenge – Maria "Bloody Mary" Sanchez, Matilda, Multiplayer Voice
Destiny – Eva Levante, Roni 55–30, Kadi 55–30, City Vendor Frame, City P.A.
Destroy All Humans! – Silhouette
Disney Infinity 3.0 – Gamora
Doom Eternal - Khan Maykr
Evil Dead: Regeneration – Sally Bowline
Evolve – Sunny
Fast & Furious: Showdown – Letty Ortiz
Final Fantasy XIII – Additional voices
For Honor – Runa
God of War – Additional Voices
God of War: Ascension – Megaera
Grand Theft Auto: San Andreas – Pedestrian
Guild Wars Factions – Vizu
Guild Wars 2 – Aurene
Halo 3 – Marines
Halo 3: ODST – Marines
Halo Wars 2 - Alice-130
Heroes of the Storm – Zagara
inFAMOUS 2 – Nix
Jurassic Park: The Game – Nima Cruz
Justice League Heroes – Killer Frost
Kid Icarus: Uprising – Pandora
Kinect Star Wars – Shu Mai
Kingdom of Paradise – Yui Min
Law & Order: Dead on the Money – Eva Stanton, Lucy Traine
Lego Star Wars III: The Clone Wars – Asajj Ventress
Lost Odyssey – Mack
Mad Max – Additional voices
Mario & Sonic at the Rio 2016 Olympic Games - Sticks
Marvel: Ultimate Alliance – Black Widow, Deathbird, Volla, Valkyrie
Marvel: Ultimate Alliance 2 – Black Widow
Marvel Ultimate Alliance 3: The Black Order – Hela
Master of Orion: Conquer the Stars – Darlok Advisor, Mrrshan Advisor
Metal Gear Solid 4: Guns of the Patriots – Additional voices Raging Raven (Beauty Voice)
Neopets: Petpet Adventures: The Wand of Wishing – Dark Faerie Guardian
Nicktoons MLB – Chum Chum
Pirates of the Caribbean: The Legend of Jack Sparrow – Madame Tang, Nassau Village Female #2, Scarlett
Psychonauts – Dogen Boole, Whispering Rocket Lady, First Rainbow Squirt
Rage 2 - Screaming Death, Oni Mega, Abadon Rusher, Lagooney Civilian
Ratchet: Deadlocked – Juanita Alvaro, Hydro Girl, Janice, Kid B, Baby Seal
Ratchet & Clank: Into the Nexus – Vendra Prog, Zurkon Jr.
Resident Evil: Operation Raccoon City – Lupo
Saints Row – Stilwater's Resident
Shark Tale – Mrs. Sanchez
Skylanders: SuperChargers – Splat
Spider-Man 3 – Dr. Stillwell
Star Wars: The Clone Wars – Republic Heroes – Asajj Ventress
Star Wars: The Old Republic – Treek, Agent Halloway, Chemish Or, Danla Zin, Doctor Senessa, Labine, Lady Muriel Corwin, Lady of Pain, Melarra, Promised One Baral, Rehanna Rist, Sraja
StarCraft series
StarCraft II: Wings of Liberty – Jessica Hall, Queen
StarCraft II: Heart of the Swarm – Zagara, Zerg Queen
StarCraft II: Legacy of the Void – Zagara, Zerg Queen
Sonic the Hedgehog series
Fire & Ice – Sticks
Rise of Lyric – Sticks, Doc Ginger
Shattered Crystal – Sticks 
Sonic Dash 2 – Sticks
Tales of Symphonia – Undine, Yutis
Tenkai Knights: Brave Battle – Beni / Venetta
The Matrix: Path of Neo – Switch, Witch Boss
Tom Clancy's EndWar – Captain Ilaria Cimino
Tribes: Vengeance – Esther
Vader Immortal: A Star Wars VR Series - Episode III – Wannek
Vampire: The Masquerade – Bloodlines – Velvet Velour, additional voices
XCOM: Chimera Squad - Mayor Nightingale

References

External links

1969 births
Living people
Actresses from New York City
Female poker players
American poker players
American television actresses
American video game actresses
American voice actresses
American women comedians
Singers from New York City
Comedians from New York City
Jewish American actresses
20th-century American actresses
21st-century American actresses
20th-century American comedians
21st-century American comedians
20th-century American singers
21st-century American singers
20th-century American women singers
21st-century American women singers
21st-century American Jews